The 2009 Italian Open (also known for 2009 Rome Masters and its sponsored title 2009 Internazionali BNL d'Italia) was a tennis tournament played on outdoor clay courts. It was the 66th edition, and was part of the ATP World Tour Masters 1000 of the 2009 ATP World Tour, and of the Premier-level tournaments of the 2009 WTA Tour. Both the men's and the women's events took place at the Foro Italico in Rome, Italy, with the men playing from April 25 through May 4, 2009, and the women from May 3 through May 9, 2009.

Finals

Men's singles

 Rafael Nadal defeated  Novak Djokovic 7–6(7–2), 6–2
It was Nadal's 5th singles title of the year, and his 36th singles title overall. It was his 4th win at the event, also winning in 2005, 2006, and 2007.

Women's singles

 Dinara Safina defeated  Svetlana Kuznetsova, 6–3, 6–2
It was Safina's first title of the year and 10th of her career.

Men's doubles

 Daniel Nestor /  Nenad Zimonjić defeated  Bob Bryan  /   Mike Bryan, 7–6(7–5), 6–3

Women's doubles

 Hsieh Su-wei /  Peng Shuai defeated  Daniela Hantuchová /  Ai Sugiyama, 7–5, 7–6(7–5)

ATP entrants

Seeds

Seedings based on the April 20, 2009 rankings.

Other entrants
The following players received wildcards into the main draw:
  Flavio Cipolla
  Potito Starace
  Fabio Fognini
  Filippo Volandri

The following players received entry from the qualifying draw:
  Mikhail Youzhny
  Juan Mónaco
  Daniel Gimeno Traver
  Jan Hernych
  Victor Crivoi
  Thomaz Bellucci
  Mischa Zverev

WTA entrants

Seeds

Seedings based on the April 27, 2009 rankings.

Other entrants
The following players received wildcards into the main draw:
  Roberta Vinci
  Karin Knapp
  Tathiana Garbin

The following players received entry from the qualifying draw:
  Ayumi Morita
  Vania King
  Jill Craybas
  Mariana Duque Marino
  Aravane Rezaï
  Yaroslava Shvedova
  Alberta Brianti
  Mariya Koryttseva

References

External links
Official website

 
Italian Open
Italian Open
2009 Italian Open (Tennis)